Sergei Sergeyevich Chernyshov (born 27 July 1984) is a Russian former professional footballer.

Club career
He made his Russian Football National League debut for FC Khimki on 16 July 2016 in a game against FC Tambov.

External links 
 
 

1984 births
People from Yelets
Living people
Russian footballers
Association football forwards
FC Metallurg Lipetsk players
FC Khimki players
FC Torpedo Moscow players
FC Dynamo Saint Petersburg players
Sportspeople from Lipetsk Oblast